West Kensington is a neighborhood in the North Philadelphia section of Philadelphia. It is north of Olde Kensington. The Market Frankford El above Front Street forms the line between West Kensington and Kensington. Its bordering neighborhoods are Kensington to the east, Harrowgate to the northeast, and Fairhill to the west. It is bounded by Kensington Avenue to the east, American Street to the west, York Street to the South and Allegheny Avenue to the north.

Demographics
As of the 2010 Census, West Kensington was 71.7% Hispanic, 17.2% African American, 5% white, 2.9% Asian, 3.1% all other. Historically it had been a heavily Irish-American neighborhood. Today the community is largely populated by Latinos (mostly Puerto Ricans and Dominicans), but also has significant populations of Irish Americans, Italian Americans, and African Americans.

Landmarks
The neighborhood was the fictional setting of the movie Rocky, by Sylvester Stallone.  It is alternatively known as "K&A" (for the intersection of Kensington and Allegheny Avenues.)

The William Adamson School and David Farragut School are listed on the National Register of Historic Places.

Education
School District of Philadelphia operates public schools.

The Free Library of Philadelphia Lillian Marrero Branch serves West Kensington.

References

External links

Neighborhoods in Philadelphia
Irish-American neighborhoods
Upper North Philadelphia
Kensington, Philadelphia